Anna Marie Prentiss is an American archaeologist and Regents Professor of Anthropology at the University of Montana.
She is known for her works on the history of the Great Plains, Pacific Northwest, and Arctic regions of North America.

References 

American archaeologists
University of Montana faculty
Living people
American anthropologists
Year of birth missing (living people)